This is a list of fictional characters from Everybody Loves Raymond, an American sitcom, originally broadcast on CBS from September 13, 1996, to May 16, 2005.

The show revolves around the life of Italian-American Ray Barone, a sportswriter from Long Island, and his wife, Debra Barone. Other main characters include Ray's parents, Frank and Marie Barone, Ray's children Ally, Michael , and Geoffrey Barone , and Ray's brother Robert Barone, with his wife Amy MacDougall.

Some of the main characters had crossover appearances in other sitcoms, including The King of Queens, The Nanny, Becker, and Cosby.

Overview

Main characters

Ray Barone

Raymond Albert "Ray" Barone (Ray Romano) is the protagonist of the sitcom. He lives on Long Island, with his wife, Debra Barone, and their three children, daughter Ally Barone and twin boys Michael and Geoffrey Barone. The family lives across the street from Raymond's parents, Marie and Frank. Ray attended St. John's University in Queens, New York. He is well known in his community as a result of his profession as a sportswriter for Newsday. He is also promoted to chief sports writer. In the early episodes, he is seen interviewing a famous sportsman, but this happens less frequently in the later seasons. Due to the nature of his work, Ray is often seen on the couch, watching sports, rather than assisting Debra with household duties and the children. His attempts to have sex with Debra are a recurring theme of the show.

Raymond is an introvert who wants to be liked by everyone. As a result, he finds it difficult to confront people, especially his mother, Marie Barone.

Parts of his backstory explain Raymond's attitude and personality. Raymond and his older brother, Robert Barone, were spoiled by Marie. Their father, Frank Barone, worked long hours and rarely showed them affection. Ray sometimes displays a similar pattern of behavior.

Raymond's laziness and sometimes childish behavior as a result of his mother's coddling is a running gag in the show. Very often, to defend himself to Debra, he goes to his mother for advice and protection. He is also very scared of her and often sides with her instead of Debra.

Despite him constantly trying to avoid his obnoxious parents who interfere with his life on a daily basis, it is perfectly clear that he still loves and cares for them.

In 2004, TV Guide ranked Ray Barone number 10 on its '50 Greatest TV Dads of All Time' list.

The character has made several crossover appearances:
1997: Cosby – "Lucas Raymondicus"
1998: The Nanny – "The Reunion Show"
1998–2005: The King of Queens (4 episodes)
1999: Becker – "Drive, They Said"

Ray Barone made his final character appearance in an episode of King of Queens that aired after Everybody Loves Raymond ended.

Debra Barone

Debra Louise Barone (Patricia Heaton) is Ray Barone's wife. She was raised by wealthy parents, Lois and Warren Whelan, and grew up in an upper-class background, unlike the other major characters in the sitcom. She has a sister, Jennifer Whelan, who is only seen once in the entire series. Following her graduation from high school, she travelled a lot and dated a few famous sportsmen. Before marrying Ray, she worked in public relations for the New York Rangers hockey team.

Debra is vulnerable and emotionally sensitive. She is sometimes unhappy as a housewife, having to put up not only with Ray's immature jokes and lazy behavior, but more with his intrusive family members, who often barge in uninvited, leaving havoc in their wake. Though Ray's parents frustrate her, she rarely shows her feelings to them, resulting in occasional bursts in private of yelling, stomping, and throwing objects.

Debra has a feud with her mother-in-law Marie Barone, who shows distrust of her ability to be a mother and a wife. Throughout the series, Debra often finds Robert Barone the most patient of the Barones, and at times she is shown to get along well with Frank Barone, who thinks of her as a daughter and understands Debra's resentment of Marie. Despite the frustration she often holds on Ray's parents, it is evident that she still loves and cares for them, as well as Robert and Ray.

She is also depressed about her parents when they argue, and she is distraught when she finds out they are divorcing. Even though she grew up in a traditional conservative family, she was a free-spirited and a popular teen in her early years. Ray once noted that, during college, she went to Mardi Gras and flashed her breasts to many people who gave her beads and also ended up topless in the newspaper.

She often calls Ray an idiot. When Ray is acting suspiciously nice towards her, she usually will say in an ominous voice, "What do you want, Ray?"

The character has also appeared in the King of Queens episode "Dire Strayts".

Marie Barone

Marie Janella Barone (Doris Roberts) is the wife of Frank, and matriarch of the Barone family. As a housewife, she excels in household duties, including cooking, cleaning, and generally keeping and maintaining a good household. She is very nosy, snobbish, arrogant, and insulting, and has a strong hold over her family, bullying those around her with guilt and a victim complex to get her way. Her penchant for this type of behavior becomes a focal point of many episodes of the show. She has very high self-esteem and regards herself as a positive example of what every wife, mother and woman should be, but in reality is responsible, at least in part, for much of the misery and conflict within the Barone family. She takes special pride in her Italian background and even arranges a tour of Italy for the whole family out of her own savings.

Throughout the series, she is shown to have favorites with certain people, with her younger son, Raymond, being the first and her daughter-in-law, Debra being possibly the last. Other than Frank, nearly everyone has a hard time standing up to Marie due to her ability to make people feel guilty, although Debra does occasionally take a stand. She is well aware of Raymond's reluctance to stand up to her, and in many situations takes advantage of this to achieve her own interests.

It is established in the flashbacks of "How They Met" that she has never liked Debra ever since Debra asked Ray to fix her futon at dinner time. Marie has never admitted her dislike of Debra outright and is careful about not saying it out loud, but she jumps at most every chance to annoy her or indirectly insult her on many occasions just for her own pleasure.

She has saved a little money on the side every day and admitted to Debra that she collected over $46,000 since her wedding. She also sends money to South America for a fundraiser. She is also shown to actually control the family's finances in front of Frank, who always thought he was the one in charge and remained oblivious to much of her savings or expenses.

As her boys were growing up, she spoiled her younger son while completely cutting Robert out of the picture. In a later episode, she claims that this was because Robert was able to take care of himself and was independent, in contrast to Ray who was a sensitive, timid, needy little boy. For example, in the season 7 episode "The Disclipinarian", Robert remembers how Marie always let Ray play and always put him on chores. However, this was just said to manipulate Robert into getting Amy MacDougall pregnant. Marie then winks to Ray, indicating this is another manipulation. In some cases, however, she is shown to care and be overprotective of Robert as well. This includes when he had nightmares growing up, when his first wife announced her intention to divorce him and Marie threw her out of the house, when he was attacked by a bull on the job, when he was interviewing for an FBI position, and her frequent attempts to get Robert out of the police force in an effort to keep him safe.

Marie is also seen constantly arguing with Frank in nearly every episode, with them constantly fighting and annoying each other. However, in some situations, there have been times when they do evidence their love for one another, despite their reluctance to be open with it. Much to Debra's annoyance, even Debra's parents find them more interesting, since they are honest to each other.

Her catchphrase is "I don't like that, [insert name]." whenever anyone says anything inappropriate.

The final episode reveals that her birthday is December 9 (this was one of Frank's classic "one-liners" as he adds "1802").

The character has also appeared in the King of Queens episode "Rayny Day".

Frank Barone

Francis Oscar "Frank" Barone (Peter Boyle) is the husband of Marie Barone and a retired bookkeeper and veteran. In the episode "The Gift" (season 2), it is Frank's 65th birthday, making his year of birth 1932. He can be seen as aggressive, selfish, uncaring, and masculine. Although it is briefly mentioned that he has a sensitive side, Frank refuses to accept it. In episodes like "Pet the Bunny", "Christmas Present", "Fathers Knows Least" and "Frank Goes Downstairs", he indicates that, though capable of patience and kindness, he deliberately cultivates a tough guy persona. However, Frank is sometimes shown to be a good family man, such as taking the fall for Debra Barone when Marie's prized canister goes missing or even trying to console Robert Barone after he becomes morose from a breakup.

He is always seen at Ray Barone and Debra's house on the black armchair with his pants unbuttoned and zipper open watching sports or at home ordering Marie to prepare his meals while sitting and reading the paper. During his sons’ childhood, Frank was virtually absent and had refused to show any sign of affection and love to either boy. He was constantly at odds with his wife Marie concerning how the boys were to be raised. He is very opinionated, outspoken, and has no problem insulting family members and strangers out in the open (this applies in particular to his wife, Marie). He calls men names like "Nancy", "Shirley", "Peaches", and "Mary" when they do not live up to his standards for what it takes to be a man.

Throughout the sitcom, Frank is shown to have socially conservative values, particularly regarding minority groups such as gays and lesbians, and ethnic groups such as the Koreans, Chinese and Japanese – he occasionally mutters "Japanese crap" when having trouble with various electronics. He does not follow or accept anything outside the social norms, to which Marie proclaims "Frank lives in blissful ignorance". Despite Marie's constant self-regard, she is accepting of these minority groups. Much to other characters' dismay, he's not above engaging in illegal or dubious activities such as gambling or stealing cable from Ray.

In his spare time, Frank is a skilled handyman and a history buff, with a particular interest in the American Civil War. He's frequently seen making repairs in Ray and Debra's house, and in "Frank Goes Downstairs" is injured while fixing their staircase. His regular get-away activity is having naked pool bath with his elderly friends at a community center, referred to as "the lodge". On every other Saturday, he takes Raymond's children to The Happy Zone.

Frank survived through World War II and fought in the Korean War. He often uses this as a reference for recounting stories of survival and how he came to be a "man".
In one particular incident, where all three Barone men were pretending to go to counselling sessions it was revealed that Ray and Robert had a long line of physically disciplinarian grandparents, with Frank's father, Joe, and his grandfather, Sal, hitting him often. However, Frank vowed to never be physically abusive towards his sons, never enforcing corporal punishment on them and never engaging in anything more than yelling at them.

His main catchphrase on the show is "Holy crap," which is often said after he sees or hears something surprising.

He is brutally honest in his relationships with others, and is often depicted as the only member of the family who is not only unafraid of Marie, but the only one who will put his foot down and stand up to her, much to the combined relief and horror of the other characters. Many of their arguments revolve around trivial and even irrational subjects, such as who invented the lawn and literally comparing apples and oranges.

They also come into conflict over Debra, whom Frank, unlike Marie, overwhelmingly loves, and even tends to be more affectionate with than he is with either of his sons. He often says to Debra that he sees her as his daughter, as mentioned in “Debra at the Lodge” when he sticks up for her when she comes to help increase membership for the lodge and all of the lodge members start ogling her. True to his blunt personality, in one episode in which the entire family (the adults) were at a counselling session with their Church priest, Father Hubley, he yelled out in front of everyone that the main reason why Marie looks down on Debra – "She [Debra] married him [Raymond], and [Marie] still can't deal with it."

Robert Barone

Robert Charles Barone (Brad Garrett), called Robbie by Marie Barone, is Ray Barone's older brother by four years and the first-born son of Marie and Frank. His birthday is April 6. At , he is the tallest Barone. Robert has several quirks, the biggest being a nervous habit of touching food to his chin before eating it, commonly known as the "Crazy Chin", which he developed to cope with anxiety which started when Raymond was born and all of Marie's attention turned to Raymond. Robert is a loving uncle and still deeply cares for his little brother Raymond. Robert has been a police officer with the NYPD for 27 years, eventually attaining the rank of Sergeant and then, by the end of the series, Lieutenant. His height, appearance and demeanor are the source of much humor, but despite his imposing size, Robert is a very skilled dancer.

After divorcing his first wife, Joanne Glotz, in 1995, Robert moved back in with his parents, became a workaholic, and was acknowledged by the NYPD for not missing one day of work for three years. Robert's advanced skills as a police officer even got him an interview with the FBI, but his mother intentionally interfered in the interview process. Robert was passed over but simply because the other candidates were more qualified. Once, he was injured on the job when he was gored in the bottom by a bull while breaking up an illegal rodeo. When he returned, he briefly left the police force out of a lack of self-confidence, and nearly became a telemarketer. Later, he took a side job as an alarm salesman for a brief time (one episode) but returned to the NYPD both times, mainly with Raymond's help. 

Robert dated his sister-in-law's, Debra Barone's, best friend, Amy MacDougall, for several years, despite a number of breakups. After a bad date with another woman, Robert ran into Amy in a bar and they soon got back together and married in 2003. In 2004, they purchased Frank and Marie's home for $26,000, but had to welcome the elder Barones back in when they were kicked out of a retirement community in New Jersey in the episode "Not So Fast."

In Season 2, Episode 19: "Good Girls", it is revealed that Robert was conceived out of wedlock. His impending birth drove Frank and Marie into marriage. Because of the relatively socially conservative values of the United States in the 1950s which viewed premarital sex as a sin, Frank and Marie were forced to lie to friends and family that Robert was two months premature.

Robert is very envious of his brother Raymond, who was favored by their mother, and though Robert is four years older than Ray and much taller, he constantly feels as if he's stuck in Ray's shadow. Despite the obvious favoring of Ray, Marie has claimed that there was never any favoritism. He has a very dark sense of humor and will make fun of Raymond to no end to get a little belated revenge. He is also known for being very passive-aggressive.

While he enjoys taunting Ray himself, Robert is very protective of his younger brother; in one episode, he overhears a radio sports show host insulting Ray at length and angrily humiliates the man in retaliation. He also respects Ray as a well-meaning, if generally absent, father, in the pattern of Frank. Robert serves as the moral conscience in the family, as the most virtuous of the characters, and often pleads with others when they are considering doing something morally questionable.

Robert's catchphrase in the show is when he finds the family gathered together silent and says: "Is this about me?"

Robert also appears in the King of Queenss episode "Road Rayge".

Amy MacDougallAmy Louise MacDougall (Monica Horan) is Robert Barone's on-and-off girlfriend, and eventual wife. They met because Amy is Debra Barone's best friend. She and Debra share the same middle name. Although Amy marries Robert in Season 7, Episode 24: "Robert's Wedding", she also appears in the previous seasons. Many issues have caused Amy and Robert to break up in the first six seasons, with one being blamed on Raymond Barone and another happening because Robert was seeing other women, one of whom was his ex-wife. Frequently, Amy apologizes to someone even if she didn't do anything wrong.

She is a bubbly and confident woman who was raised in a family of devout Protestants, who live in Pennsylvania. She describes her parents as "people who wouldn't yell if they were on fire." Amy was a virgin when she met Robert, which Ray had a hard time understanding, as Amy was 33 at the time. She eventually lost her virginity to Robert before they were married, but they were spotted having sex by Robert's neighbors, causing them to sign a sheet mandating bedroom curtains in the apartment building.

Like Debra, she also at times gets into conflict with Marie Barone (albeit less frequently). Although she is known for her cheerful personality, she has shown herself to not be afraid to push back against Marie's manipulation. Notable examples of this are found in Season 3, Episode 25: "Robert Moves Back", Season 8, Episode 2: "Thank You Notes", and Season 9, Episode 8: "A Job for Robert".

Barone childrenAlexandra "Ally" Barone (154 episodes; played by Madylin Sweeten) – Ray and Debra Barone's only daughter. She is six years old at the beginning of the series, and is fourteen by the series finale. She was named after Ray Romano's real-life daughter. In the beginning, she is somewhat mischievous and naughty much like her brothers, but becomes loyal and helpful by the end. However, she still occasionally fibs and answers back to her parents if she doesn't get what she wants, such as a $250 silk dress which would only be worn once.Geoffrey and Michael Barone' (130 episodes; played by Sullivan and Sawyer Sweeten respectively) – Ray and Debra's identical twin sons. They are two years old at the beginning of the series and are ten years old by the show's finale. A running joke is Frank Barone's insistence that Geoffrey may have homosexual tendencies, such as when he walks in on the two boys rehearsing to play fairies in a school production. The two are playful, energetic, and prone to causing chaos even without trying but in general are well-behaved. In the pilot episode, they were played by a set of triplets and were called "Gregory" and "Matthew" after Romano's real-life twin sons. Their names were then changed to Geoffrey and Michael respectively.

Recurring characters

Guest characters 
The following is a list of characters who only had one appearance. They are listed by seasons.

Season 1

Season 2

Season 3

References 

Everybody Loves Raymond